Naseerullah Wazir is a Pakistani politician who was a member of the Provincial Assembly of Khyber Pakhtunkhwa from August 2019 to January 2023.

Political career
Wazir contested 2019 Khyber Pakhtunkhwa provincial election on 20 July 2019 from constituency PK-114 (South Waziristan-II) on the ticket of Pakistan Tehreek-e-Insaf. He won the election by the majority of 842 votes over the independent runner up Arif Wazir. He garnered 11,114 votes while Arif Wazir received 10,272 votes.

References

Living people
Pakistan Tehreek-e-Insaf MPAs (Khyber Pakhtunkhwa)
Politicians from Khyber Pakhtunkhwa
Year of birth missing (living people)